George Christopher Zoley (born February 7, 1950) is a Greek-born American businessman, the chairman, chief executive officer (CEO), and founder of the GEO Group, which manages prisons and jails in the US and internationally.

Early life
George Christopher Zoley was born in Florina, Greece on February 7, 1950.

Zoley holds both a bachelor's degree and master's degree in public administration from Florida Atlantic University, and a doctorate in Public Administration from Nova Southeastern University.

Career
Zoley established The GEO Group as a division of The Wackenhut Corporation in 1984 when the company was named Wackenhut Corrections Corporation. He founded GEO care Inc. a subsidiary of The GEO Group, Inc. in 1984. Prior to founding the GEO Group, he served as manager, director, and vice president of government services at Wackenhut. He also served as the CEO of Cornell Companies Inc. starting from August 12, 2010.

Other work
Zoley is a former chairman, and a former member of the board of trustees at  Florida Atlantic University (FAU). He was chair of the FAU presidential search committee, and a member of the FAU Foundation board of directors.

Zoley has received an Ellis Island Medal of Honor.

Zoley is believed to be the front man of a rock band named Akron. However, this has not been confirmed.

References

1950 births
Living people
American company founders
American chief executives
American corporate directors
Businesspeople from Florida
Florida Atlantic University alumni
Nova Southeastern University alumni